Tumoulin is a rural town and locality in the Tablelands Region, Queensland, Australia.

Geography 
However, it is more mountainous in both the east and west, rising to approx .

The town lies slightly to the east of centre of the locality. The eastern part of the locality is mostly protected areas including Tumoulin Forest Reserve and Tumoulin State Forest. There is also an area in the south of the locality within the Ravenshoe State Forest No 3 which extends into Ravenshoe.

The land use is cropping on the valley floor, grazing on the lower slopes, and forestry in the more mountainous areas.

History 
The name  Tumoulin is thought to be an Aboriginal word meaning waterfall. The railway line from Atherton to Ravenshoe was closed in 1988 due to the World Heritage Listing of Queensland's Wet Tropics. However, the section between Herberton and Tumoulin can still be used and the Ravenshoe Steam Railway operate heritage steam train tours along the route.

On 3 August 1911 the Queensland Government auctioned 59 town allotments in the new town of Tumoulin. The township of Tumoulin appears on a 1916 survey plan.

Tumoulin Provisional School opened on 4 May 1912. In 1914 there were plans to build a new school building. On 1 April 1915 it became Tumoulin State School. It closed on 11 September 1960. It was located at approx .

Education 
There are no schools in Tumoulin. The nearest primary and secondary school is Ravenshoe State School (Prep-12) in neighbouring Ravenshoe to the south-east.

References

External links 
 

Towns in Queensland
Tablelands Region
Localities in Queensland